"Dreams" is the debut single by American Idol season 3 runner-up Diana DeGarmo.

The song peaked at number fourteen on the Billboard Hot 100, and is to date DeGarmo's only and highest-charting single. 
  
The B-Sides includes a cover of "Don't Cry Out Loud"  and her rendition of "I Believe".

References

Songs written by Desmond Child
Songs written by Andreas Carlsson
Songs written by Chris Braide
2004 debut singles
American Idol songs
Diana DeGarmo songs
2004 songs
Pop ballads
RCA Records singles